Shammim Afridi is a Pakistani politician who has been a Member of the Senate of Pakistan, since March 2018. He was Secretary Finance JWP Balochistan when Nawab Akbar Bugti was President of JWP

Political career
Afridi was elected to the Senate of Pakistan as an independent candidate on general seat from FATA in 2018 Pakistani Senate election. He joined Pakistan Muslim League (N) (PML-N) after getting elected.
He took his oath as Senator on 12 March 2018 and joined the treasury benches, led by PML-N.

References

Living people
Members of the Senate of Pakistan
Pakistan Muslim League (N) politicians
Year of birth missing (living people)